Egzi Gebre-Gebre (born 22 June 1949) is an Ethiopian sprinter. He competed in the men's 100 metres at the 1972 Summer Olympics.

References

External links
 

1949 births
Living people
Athletes (track and field) at the 1972 Summer Olympics
Ethiopian male sprinters
Olympic athletes of Ethiopia
Place of birth missing (living people)
20th-century Ethiopian people
21st-century Ethiopian people